Pinnacle Glacier is in Mount Rainier National Park in the U.S. state of Washington, on the northeast slopes of Pinnacle Peak.

See also
List of glaciers in the United States

References

Glaciers of Washington (state)
Cirques of the United States
Glaciers of Lewis County, Washington